Boland Park is a multi-purpose stadium in Paarl, South Africa.  It is currently used mostly for cricket matches and hosted three matches during the 2003 Cricket World Cup.  Boland cricket team and the Paarl Royals both stage home matches at the ground.  The stadium has a capacity of 10,000 people.

History
The first ever ODI match was between India and Zimbabwe in 1997 during the Tri-Series which ended in a tie. 
On 11 January 2012, hosts South Africa beat Sri Lanka by a margin of 258 runs in an ODI. Sri Lanka were dismissed for a low total of 43, which is their lowest ODI total in their history.

2003 Cricket World Cup
The following 2003 Cricket World Cup matches were played in Boland Park. A total of three matches were played at the venue during the 2003 World Cup.

International Centuries
There are nine ODI centuries that have been scored at the venue.

International five-wicket hauls

Two five-wicket hauls have been taken on the ground, both in men's One Day Internationals.

References

External links
 
 Cricket Archive page

Cricket grounds in South Africa
Multi-purpose stadiums in South Africa
Sports venues in the Western Cape
Paarl
2003 Cricket World Cup stadiums